Alexandru Daniel Pena (born 26 January 1990 in Craiova) is a retired Romanian goalkeeper.

References

External links
 
 
 Alexandru Pena profile ASBari.it

1990 births
Living people
Romanian footballers
Romania under-21 international footballers
Romania youth international footballers
Association football goalkeepers
A.S. Roma players
S.S.C. Bari players
F.C. Matera players
Serie B players
Liga II players
Romanian expatriate footballers
Romanian expatriate sportspeople in Italy
Expatriate footballers in Italy
Sportspeople from Craiova